A total lunar eclipse took place on Wednesday 8 October 2014. It is the second of two total lunar eclipses in 2014, and the second in a tetrad (four total lunar eclipses in series). Other eclipses in the tetrad are those of 15 April 2014, 4 April 2015, and 28 September 2015. Occurring only 2.1 days after perigee (Perigee on 6 October 2014), the Moon's apparent diameter was larger, 1960.6 arcseconds (32 arcminutes, 40.6 arcseconds).

This is the 42nd member of Lunar Saros 127. The previous event is the September 1996 lunar eclipse. The next event is October 2032 lunar eclipse.

Visibility and appearance 

The eclipse was visible in its entirety over the Northern Pacific. Viewers in North America experienced the eclipse after midnight on Wednesday, 8 October, and the eclipse was visible from the Philippines, Western Pacific, Australia, Indonesia, Japan, and Eastern Asia after sunset on the evening of 8 October. Many areas of North America experienced a selenelion, able to see both the sun and the eclipsed moon at the same time.

Background 

A lunar eclipse occurs when the Moon passes within Earth's umbra (shadow). As the eclipse begins, the Earth's shadow first darkens the Moon slightly.  Then, the shadow begins to "cover" part of the Moon, turning it a dark red-brown color (typically - the color can vary based on atmospheric conditions).  The Moon appears to be reddish because of Rayleigh scattering (the same effect that causes sunsets to appear reddish) and the refraction of that light by the Earth's atmosphere into its umbra.
The following simulation shows the approximate appearance of the Moon passing through the earth's shadow. The Moon's brightness is exaggerated within the umbral shadow. The southern portion of the Moon was closest to the center of the shadow, making it darkest, and most red in appearance.

The planet Uranus was near opposition (opposition on 7 October) during the eclipse, just over 1° from the eclipsed Moon. Shining at magnitude 5.7, Uranus should have been bright enough to identify in binoculars. Due to parallax, the position of Uranus relative to the Moon varied significantly depending on the viewing position on the surface of Earth.

Gallery

Timing

† The Moon was not visible during this part of the eclipse in this time zone.

Related eclipses

Eclipses of 2014 
 A total lunar eclipse on 15 April.
 A non-central annular solar eclipse on 29 April.
 A total lunar eclipse on 8 October.
 A partial solar eclipse on 23 October.

The eclipse is the one of four total lunar eclipses in a short-lived series at the descending node of the Moon's orbit.

The lunar year series repeats after 12 lunations, or 354 days (shifting back about 10 days in sequential years). Because of the date shift, Earth's shadow will be about 11° west in sequential events.

Half-Saros cycle
A lunar eclipse will be preceded and followed by solar eclipses by 9 years and 5.5 days (a half saros). This lunar eclipse is related to two annular solar eclipses of solar saros 134.

Saros series
Lunar saros series 127, repeating every 18 years and 11 days, has a total of 72 lunar eclipse events including 54 umbral lunar eclipses (38 partial lunar eclipses and 16 total lunar eclipses). Solar Saros 134 interleaves with this lunar saros with an event occurring every 9 years 5 days alternating between each saros series.

Tzolkinex 
 Preceded: Lunar eclipse of August 28, 2007

 Followed: Lunar eclipse of November 19, 2021

See also 
April 2014 lunar eclipse
List of lunar eclipses and List of 21st-century lunar eclipses

References

 
 Wake Up to October 8th's Total Lunar Eclipse (SkyandTelescope.com)
 Hermit eclipse: 2014-10-08
 Total Lunar Eclipse, October 2014 InfoSite - Mattastro
 Animation of the October 8 2014 eclipse at shadowandsubstance.com

2014-10
2014 in science
October 2014 events